Hard Groovin' is an album by saxophonist Ricky Ford which was recorded in 1989 and released on the Muse label.

Reception

The AllMusic review by Scott Yanow stated "The consistent tenor-saxophonist Ricky Ford, who was often the youngest player on the bandstand when he first emerged in the late '70s, is easily the oldest musician on this energetic modern bop album. ... Ford (heard on both alto and tenor) is easily the most impressive solo voice on this high-quality outing. Ford and his quintet perform five of his originals, a Geoff Keezer song and the standards "Jitterbug Waltz" and "Minority" with driving swing and personable creativity".

Track listing
All compositions by Ricky Ford except where noted
 "Masaman" (Geoff Keezer) – 6:14
 "Mr. C.P." – 5:45
 "New Bop" – 6:15
 "DD Blues" – 6:57
 "Hard Groovin'" – 5:33
 "Fundamental Mood" – 7:00
 "Jitterbug Waltz" (Fats Waller) – 5:03
 "Minority" (Gigi Gryce) – 4:23

Personnel
Ricky Ford - tenor saxophone, alto saxophone
Roy Hargrove – trumpet 
Geoff Keezer – piano 
Robert Hurst – bass 
Jeff "Tain" Watts – drums

References

Muse Records albums
Ricky Ford albums
1989 albums
Albums recorded at Van Gelder Studio